Eric Frederick Trump (born January 6, 1984) is an American businessman, activist, and former reality television presenter. He is the third child and second son of Donald Trump, 45th president of the United States from 2017 to 2021, and his first wife, Ivana Trump.

Trump is a trustee and executive vice president of his father's business, the Trump Organization, running it alongside his brother Donald Jr. He also served as a boardroom judge on his father's TV show The Apprentice. During their father's presidency, the brothers continued to make new investments in foreign countries, as well as collect payments in their U.S. properties from foreign governments, despite having pledged not to do so.

Early life

Eric Trump was born in New York City and attended Trinity School. His parents divorced in 1990, when he was six years old.  As a boy, Trump spent his summers in the Czech countryside near Zlín with his maternal grandparents. His grandfather, Miloš Zelníček, who died in 1990, was an engineer; his grandmother, Maria, worked in a shoe factory. His grandfather taught Trump to hunt and fish.

In 2002, Trump graduated from the Hill School. He graduated with a degree in finance and management from Georgetown University in Washington, D.C.

Trump started accompanying his father to job sites and negotiations from a young age. He has said he mowed lawns, laid tile, and did other work on his father's properties in his youth. Trump briefly considered other careers but decided to join the family business while a high school student.

Career

The Trump Organization

Trump is the Trump Organization's executive vice president of development and acquisitions. He worked with his sister, Ivanka, to redesign and renovate Trump National Doral and its Blue Monster course in Miami, Florida.

In 2013, Trump received Wine Enthusiast Magazines "Rising Star of the Year" Award.

Amid the Trump–Ukraine scandal—where President Trump asked the Ukrainian president to investigate Joe Biden and his son, Hunter—Eric Trump strongly criticized Hunter, accusing him of nepotism. Eric claimed that, unlike Hunter, "When my father became president, our family stopped doing international business deals." But when Donald Trump became president, rather than place his assets in a blind trust, he made Eric a top executive in the family business, which continued to operate and promote business transactions across the world. PolitiFact and the Washington Post fact-checker rated Eric Trump's assertion that the Trump family "got out of all international business" false. PolitiFact noted that not only had the Trump family engaged in international business dealings since Trump became president, but that some of the president's children, including Eric, had openly celebrated their international business activities during that time.

In October 2019, Eric Trump complained of the Bidens, "Why is it that every family goes into politics and enriches themselves?" Shortly before he made that statement, President Trump had decided that the G-7 summit would be held at the Trump Doral resort, owned by the Trump Organization. President Trump reversed his decision amid bipartisan condemnation.

Russian funding
In 2017 it was reported that Eric Trump had said that "we don't rely on American banks. We have all the funding we need out of Russia" and that "we've got some guys that really, really love golf, and they're really invested in our programmes. We just go there all the time." In 2008 Trump said that "in terms of high-end product influx into the US, Russians make up a pretty disproportionate cross-section of a lot of our assets" and that "we see a lot of money pouring in from Russia."

Television

Trump was a boardroom judge on his father's reality television series The Apprentice (2010–2015). He appeared in 23 episodes.

The Eric Trump Foundation
In 2007, Trump established the Eric Trump Foundation, a public charity to raise money for St. Jude Children's Research Hospital in Tennessee. On November 30, 2012, the foundation committed to raising $20 million over ten years for the naming rights to the new Eric Trump Foundation Surgery & ICU Center in the Kay Research and Care Center, a $198 million tower that opened on February 19, 2015, on the St. Jude campus.

St. Jude stated in 2013 that the 7th Annual Eric Trump Foundation Golf Invitational on September 9, 2013, at the Trump National Golf Club in Briarcliff, New York, had "...raised $1.5 million for the kids of St. Jude", for a total of $6 million since 2006. On December 30, 2016, Richard C. Shadyac Jr., the president of the fundraising organization of St. Jude Children's Research Hospital, wrote the Eric Trump Foundation a letter stating that the foundation and "...related efforts, such as an Eric Trump Foundation-affiliated team that participates in the New York City Marathon", had raised $16.3 million for the hospital since the charity's inception ten years earlier.

On December 21, 2016, Trump announced that he would stop active fundraising for the Eric Trump Foundation as of December 31. The move came to avoid the appearance that donors were using him to gain access to his father after he won the presidential election.

The foundation's 2016 tax return, filed under its alternative name the Curetivity Foundation, shows that the contributions it received increased from $1.8 million in 2015 to $3.2 million in 2016. The foundation gave $2,910,000 in donations to St. Jude and several smaller donations to other charities while paying a total of $145,000 to various for-profit properties the Trump family owned.

Controversy about funds usage
In 2016, the fundraising president of St. Jude Children's Research Hospital stated that the Eric Trump Foundation had raised and donated $16.3 million to the hospital since the charity's foundation.

In June 2017, Forbes reported that the Eric Trump Foundation shifted money intended to go to cancer patients to the Trumps' businesses. Eric Trump had asserted that his foundation got to use Trump Organization assets for free ("We get to use our assets 100% free of charge"), but that appears not to be true. According to Forbes, more than $1.2 million of the donations went to the Trump Organization for the use of Trump's Westchester golf course, and "Golf charity experts say the listed expenses defy any reasonable cost justification for a one-day golf tournament." According to a former foundation director, "We did have to cover the expenses....The charity had grown so much that the Trump Organization couldn't absorb all of those costs anymore." Forbes acknowledged that the charity has done a great deal of good, including an intensive-care unit that opened in 2015 at St. Jude and funding cancer research. According to Trump, the Foundation's expense ratio is 12.6%, and "at no time did the Trump Organization profit in any way from the foundation or any of its activities".

Forbes also reported that more than $500,000 of the money donated for cancer patients "was re-donated to other charities, many of which were connected to Trump family members or interests, including at least four groups that subsequently paid to hold golf tournaments at Trump courses." According to Forbes, "All of this seems to defy federal tax rules and state laws that ban self-dealing and misleading donors. It also raises larger questions about the Trump family dynamics and whether Eric and his brother, Don Jr., can be truly independent of their father." The foundation says that relevant donors were informed that donations would be redirected.

The Eric Trump Foundation has advertised that its golf charity events raised money exclusively for St. Jude Children's Research Hospital, with 95–100% of the money raised going toward the charity. Public tax records show that the foundation applied significant amounts of the funds raised to pay costs of the events to the Trump Organization for use of its facilities. Additionally, the foundation donated to charitable causes other than St. Jude and made grants to several other charities, including at least three animal welfare organizations and the American Society for Enology and Viticulture, a California wine industry organization.

Trump said in July 2016 that Donald Trump had made "hundreds of thousands of dollars in personal donations" to the Eric Trump Foundation in the past, but there is no evidence of that. When The Washington Post requested evidence, Trump appeared to backtrack and refused to give details.

In June 2017, the New York State Attorney General's Office confirmed that it had begun an inquiry into the Eric Trump Foundation, based on issues the Forbes investigation raised. The investigation was reported as ongoing in December 2018.

Trump presidential campaigns

2016 presidential campaign

Donald Trump's 2016 presidential campaign was formally launched on June 16, 2015, at Trump Tower in New York City. Eric was a key advisor, fundraiser, and campaign surrogate during the campaign. He and his wife made campaign appearances in numerous states on his father's behalf.

On August 2, 2016, in a television appearance on CBS This Morning, Trump was asked to comment on his father's controversial statement to USA Today the previous day in which he said that if his daughter were ever subjected to sexual harassment in the workplace, he hoped she would find another company to work for or switch careers. Trump said, "Ivanka is a strong, powerful woman; she wouldn't allow herself to be objected [recte subjected] to it."

Attempts to overturn the 2020 presidential election 

Trump has promoted several conspiracy theories.

In May 2020, Trump said on Fox News that stay-at-home orders to combat the spread of COVID-19 were a strategy by the Democrats and the Joe Biden campaign intended to prevent his father's reelection by depriving him of the ability to conduct large campaign rallies. Trump said that after election day, "coronavirus will magically all of a sudden go away and disappear and everybody will be able to reopen."

In September 2020, Trump spread a false video that appeared to show Biden "being caught red-handed using a teleprompter" when he was not.

Following his father's electoral defeat Eric Trump has engaged in attempts to overturn the 2020 United States presidential election, falsely calling the election result a "fraud" and threatening Republican lawmakers to overturn the result.

While ballots were being counted in the 2020 election, Trump made baseless claims intended to cast doubt on Pennsylvania's ballot-counting process. He shared a fake video that purported to show Trump ballots being burned.

Following the storming of the United States Capitol by his father's supporters in January 2021, Trump was among those who advanced the conspiracy theory that people associated with antifa were responsible for the attack.

Personal life

Spouse

On July 4, 2013, Trump became engaged to his longtime girlfriend Lara Lea Yunaska, an associate producer on the syndicated television news program Inside Edition. They married on November 8, 2014, at Mar-a-Lago Club in Palm Beach, Florida. The couple's first child, Eric "Luke" Trump, a son, was born in September 2017, and their daughter, Carolina Dorothy, in August 2019.

Big game hunting 
In 2010, People for the Ethical Treatment of Animals (PETA) criticized Trump, a big game hunter, for an African hunting trip he took with his older brother. PETA condemned the brothers after photos showed them on an organized safari in Zimbabwe, where they killed elephants and leopards. The director general of the Zimbabwe Parks and Wildlife Management Authority, V. Chandenga, issued an official response supporting the brothers and calling any allegations of illegality "baseless" and "false". The brothers defended their safari on Twitter, affirming their actions as hunters and longtime advocates of the outdoors. Donald Trump also addressed the controversy, saying on TMZ that he fully supported his sons' actions.

Residency
In April 2021, Trump and his wife acquired a $3.2 million home in Jupiter, Florida. In March 2022, Trump joined other members of his family in switching his official residency from New York to Florida.

References

External links

Living people
1984 births
21st-century American businesspeople
American conspiracy theorists
American construction businesspeople
American corporate directors
American hunters
American nonprofit businesspeople
American people of Austrian descent
American people of Moravian descent
American people of German descent
American people of Scottish descent
American real estate businesspeople
Businesspeople from New York City
Children of presidents of the United States
McDonough School of Business alumni
New York (state) Republicans
Philanthropists from New York (state)
The Hill School alumni
The Trump Organization employees
Trinity School (New York City) alumni
Eric
Children of Donald Trump